Elmo Lincoln (born Otto Elmo Linkenhelt; February 6, 1889June 27, 1952) was an American stage and film actor whose career in motion pictures spanned the silent and sound eras. He performed in over 100 screen productions between 1913 and 1952 and was the first actor to portray on film novelist Edgar Rice Burroughs' fictional "jungle" character Tarzan, initially appearing in that role in the 1918 release Tarzan of the Apes.

Early years 
Lincoln was born Otto Elmo Linkenhelt in Rochester, Indiana. He had six siblings, and he left home at 18 to begin a railroad career as a brakeman on a train. He went on to be a boxer, sailor, and stevedore before he became an actor.

Career 
Lincoln began acting for director D. W. Griffith, who changed the performer's name. Lincoln's first role was in The Battle of Elderbush Gulch (1914), followed by Judith of Bethula (1914), The Birth of a Nation (1915), and Intolerance (1916).

Tarzan films
Stellan Windrow, who initially portrayed the title character in 1918's Tarzan of the Apes, went into military service five weeks after filming began. Lincoln replaced Windrow, although author Edgar Rice Burroughs objected to the choice. Lincoln became best known for that role. (Gordon Griffith played Tarzan as a child in the same movie).  He portrayed the character twice more—in The Romance of Tarzan (also 1918) and in the 1921 serial The Adventures of Tarzan.

Following the end of the silent movie era, Elmo left Hollywood and tried his hand at mining. He also had a salvage business in Salt Lake City. In the late 1930s, he returned to the film industry, most often employed as an extra.  He appeared, uncredited, in two Tarzan films in the 1940s—as a circus roustabout in Tarzan's New York Adventure (1942), and as a fisherman repairing his net in Tarzan's Magic Fountain (1949).

Final role

His final work saw him also playing a brief, uncredited role in the 1952 film Carrie, starring Laurence Olivier.  According to Tarzan of the Movies, by Gabe Essoe, Lincoln was quite proud of his work in this film, as he was an admirer of Olivier.

Death

Lincoln died of a heart attack on June 27, 1952, at age 63.He is interred in a niche at Hollywood Forever Cemetery. 

For his contribution to the motion picture industry, he has a star on the Hollywood Walk of Fame at 7042 Hollywood Boulevard.

Biography
Lincoln's daughter, Marci'a Lincoln Rudolph, recounts his life in her 2001 book My Father, Elmo Lincoln: The Original Tarzan.

Partial filmography

1910s
 The Battle at Elderbush Gulch (1913, Short) - Cavalryman
 John Barleycorn (1914)
 Judith of Bethulia (1914)
 Brute Force (1914, Short) - In Club (Prologue) / Tribesman (The Old Days)
 Buckshot John (1915) - The Sheriff
 The Birth of a Nation (1915) - Blacksmith (uncredited)
 The Slave Girl (1915, Short) - Bob West 
 The Absentee (1915) - The Toiler - in the Prologue
 Her Shattered Idol (1915) - Ben - a Blacksmith
 Jordan Is a Hard Road (1915)
 Hoodoo Ann (1916) - Officer Lambert
 The Half Breed (1916) - The Doctor (uncredited)
 Gretchen the Greenhorn (1916) - Mystery Ship Captain
 Intolerance (1916) - The Mighty Man of Valor (uncredited)
 The Children of the Feud (1916) - Bad Bald Clayton
 The Fatal Glass of Beer (1916)
 The Bad Boy (1917) - Yeggman
 Betsy's Burglar (1917)
 Might and the Man (1917) - McFadden
 Aladdin and the Wonderful Lamp (1917) - Magic Genie
 Treasure Island (1918) - Prologue Player
 Tarzan of the Apes (1918) - Tarzan
 The Kaiser, the Beast of Berlin (1918) - Marcas, the Blacksmith
 The Romance of Tarzan (1918) - Tarzan
 The Greatest Thing in Life (1918) - The American Soldier
 The Road Through the Dark (1918) - Pvt. Schultz
 Elmo the Mighty (1919) - Capt. Elmo Armstrong
 The Fall of Babylon (re-edited from Intolerance) (1919) - The Mighty Man of Valour

1920s
 Elmo the Fearless (1920) - The Stranger
 Under Crimson Skies (1920) - Captain Yank Barstow
 The Flaming Disc (1920) - Elmo Gray / Jim Gray
 Devotion (1921) - Robert Trent
 The Adventures of Tarzan (1921) - Tarzan
 Quincy Adams Sawyer (1922) - Abner Stiles
Rupert of Hentzau (1923) - Simon
 The Hunchback of Notre Dame (1923) - (uncredited)
 The Rendezvous (1923) - Godunoff
 Fashion Row (1923) - Kaminoff
 All Around Frying Pan (1925) - Foreman Slade
 Whom Shall I Marry (1926)
 King of the Jungle (1927, Serial)

1930s
 Union Pacific (1939) - Card Player (uncredited)
 Blue Montana Skies (1939) - Mack (uncredited)
 Wyoming Outlaw (1939) - U.S. Marshal Gregg
 Timber Stampede (1939) - Townsman (uncredited)
 Colorado Sunset (1939) - Dairyman Burns
 The Real Glory (1939) - Townsman (uncredited)
 The Hunchback of Notre Dame (1939) - Minor Role (uncredited)

1940s
 Stage to Chino (1940) - Townsman (uncredited)
 Reap the Wild Wind (1942) - Minor Role (uncredited)
 Tarzan's New York Adventure (1942) - Circus Roustabout (uncredited)
 Bandit Ranger (1942) - Townsman in Bank (uncredited)
 Fighting Frontier (1943) - Barfly who knocks Ike down (uncredited)
 Frontier Fury (1943) - Sam Stewart (uncredited)
 The Story of Dr. Wassell (1944) - Minor Role (uncredited)
 Black Arrow (1944, Serial) - Chief Arano (uncredited)
 When the Lights Go on Again (1944) - Farmer #2 (uncredited)
 The Man Who Walked Alone (1945) - Turnkey
 Escape in the Fog (1945) - Cop (uncredited)
 The Return of the Durango Kid (1945) - Luke Blake (uncredited)
 Badman's Territory (1946) - Dick Broadwell (uncredited)
 Rolling Home (1947) - Racing Official
 A Double Life (1947) - Detective (uncredited)
 Tap Roots (1948) - Sergeant (uncredited)
 Tarzan's Magic Fountain (1949) - A Fisherman (uncredited)

1950s
 Hollywood Story (1951) - Elmo Lincoln (uncredited)
 Iron Man (1951) - Minor Role (uncredited)
 Carrie (1952) - Minor Role (uncredited) (final film role)

References

External links

 

1889 births
1952 deaths
American male film actors
American male silent film actors
People from Rochester, Indiana
Burials at Hollywood Forever Cemetery
Male actors from Indiana
20th-century American male actors